Nikolai Leonard Smith (born 5 January 1993) is an Irish cricketer who plays for the Italy national cricket team. He qualifies as an Italian citizen through his mother, who comes from Ottaviano.

He made his Twenty20 cricket debut for Northern Knights in the 2017 Inter-Provincial Trophy on 26 May 2017. He made his List A debut for Northern Knights in the 2017 Inter-Provincial Cup on 29 May 2017. He made his first-class debut for Northern Knights in the 2017 Inter-Provincial Championship on 30 May 2017.

In November 2019, he was named in Italy's squad for the Cricket World Cup Challenge League B tournament in Oman. In Italy's opening match of the tournament, against Kenya, Smith scored his first century in List A cricket.

In September 2021, he was named in Italy's Twenty20 International (T20I) squad for the Regional Final of the 2021 ICC Men's T20 World Cup Europe Qualifier tournament. He made his T20I debut on 15 October 2021, for Italy against Denmark.

References

External links
 

1993 births
Living people
Irish cricketers
Italian cricketers
Italy Twenty20 International cricketers
Northern Knights cricketers
Cricketers from Cape Town